Mark Spenkelink (born 27 January 1997) is a Dutch footballer who plays for RKC Waalwijk.

Club career
On 31 December 2021, Spenkelink signed with RKC Waalwijk until the end of the 2021–22 season.

References

1997 births
Living people
Dutch footballers
Association football goalkeepers
Go Ahead Eagles players
Karlstad BK players
Jong PSV players
FC Locomotive Tbilisi players
RKC Waalwijk players
Ettan Fotboll players
Eerste Divisie players
Erovnuli Liga players
Dutch expatriate footballers
Expatriate footballers in Sweden
Dutch expatriate sportspeople in Sweden
Expatriate footballers in Georgia (country)
Dutch expatriate sportspeople in Georgia (country)